Frederikssund is a Danish town, seat of the Frederikssund Municipality, in the Region Hovedstaden with a population of 16,850 (1 January 2022). It received the status of market town in 1810. The town is famous for its annual Viking Games as well as for the J.F. Willumsen museum. Since 1935, it has been connected to Hornsherred via the Kronprins Frederik Bridge.

History

There is evidence of communities dating right back to the stone age with a number of burial sites in the area. It seems probable that there was a small settlement at the present location of Frederikssund in the Middle Ages but the development of the town probably began in the 12th century with the construction of a church at what was then known as Ude Sundby or Sundby Færge (Sundby Ferry). Located at a narrow point on Roskilde Fjord, Sundby Færge became the harbour for the nearby market town of Slangerup.

In 1809-10, the status of market town was transferred from Slangerup to Frederikssund, named after King Frederik III. In 1868, a pontoon bridge linking Frederikssund to Hornsherred was opened. This was replaced by today's Kronprins Frederik Bridge in 1935.

Frederikssund's rapid expansion from a small town at the end of the 19th century is due in large part to the railway connection with Ballerup in 1879 which was upgraded to a frequent suburban service to Copenhagen in 1989.

Geography
Frederikssund is located on the east coast of Roskilde Fjord, about 45 km north-west of Copenhagen, 20 km south of Hillerød and 30 km north of Roskilde. It is less than an hour from Copenhagen by either road or rail. S-trains (suburban commuter trains) leave about once every 10 minutes. Copenhagen Airport can be reached by road or rail in about an hour.

The low hills on which Frederikssund lies are formed of moraines from the last ice age. The shallow Roskilde Fjord which separates Frederikssund from Hornsherred originated in the same period.

The fertile land surrounding Frederikssund is used for mixed farming - with an emphasis on cereals, root crops and pigs.

Frederikssund today
The recent development of the town center and the old commercial harbour have given Frederikssund a new look which reflects its growing popularity as a residential area with connections to Copenhagen and surroundings. It has all the facilities associated with a modern Danish town: museums, a public library, supermarkets, a hospital and sports and recreation centers. With a location facing west over the Roskilde Fjord, it has many footpaths along the shores and up into the higher ground to the east.
The local rail and bus services are well developed.

Culture
Cultural attractions include the J.F. Willumsens Museum, the Færgegården local history museum at the far end of the bridge over to Hornsherred, and the annual Viking plays held in a large outdoor theatre.

Leisure activities
Activities range from  sailing, rowing, cycling, golfing or gliding to simply sitting out on the main pedestrian street (gågade).

Sports
There are several sports clubs and facilities in Frederikssund covering soccer, American football, swimming, basketball, bowling and cycling.

Notable people

Albert Jensen (1847–1913), architect
Eugen Jørgensen (1858–1910), architect and local politician
Georg Achen (1860–1912), naturalist painter of portraits
Oluf Pedersen (1891–1970), politician and member of the Folketing 1932–45 and 1950–60
Povl Søndergaard (1905–1986) sculptor of lifelike busts and female figures, died here
Peter Alsing Nielsen (1907–1985), painter
Regin Prenter (1907–1990), Lutheran priest, theologian and parish priest of Branderup
Jette Thyssen (born 1933), textile artist, painter and lithographer
Annie Birgit Garde (born 1933), actress
Grethe Ingmann (1938–1990), singer, died here
Anne Dorte of Rosenborg (1947–2014), countess and wife of Count Christian of Rosenborg
Jens Galschiøt (born 1954), sculptor
Morten Messerschmidt (born 1980), politician and MEP

Sport

Vilhelm Johansen (1898–1993), sports shooter
Morian Hansen (1905–1995), motorcycle speedway rider & RAF Squadron Leader
Kresten Bjerre (1946–2014), footballer, died here
Martin Haldbo Hansen (born 1969), rower
Anders Kristiansen (born 1979), badminton player
Mathias Boe (born 1980), badminton player, Olympic medalist
Mie Skov (born 1986), table tennis player

Twin towns - sister cities
Frederikssund practices twinning on the municipal level. For the twin towns, see twin towns of Frederikssund Municipality.

See also
Frederikssund station
Frederikssundbanen

References

External links

Cities and towns in the Capital Region of Denmark
Frederikssund Municipality